The 15th Annual Screen Actors Guild Awards, honoring the best achievements in film and television performances for the year 2008, were presented on January 25, 2009. The ceremony was held at the Shrine Exposition Center in Los Angeles, California for the thirteenth consecutive year. It was broadcast live simultaneously by TNT and TBS.

The nominees were announced on December 18, 2008 by Angela Bassett and Eric McCormack at Los Angeles' Pacific Design Center's Silver Screen Theater.

Doubt received the highest number of nominations among the film categories with five, four for individual performances and one for ensemble performance. In the television categories, Boston Legal, 30 Rock, John Adams, Mad Men and The Closer had the most nominations with three each.

The biggest winner of the evening was 30 Rock, which won in all three categories in which it was nominated. The Dark Knight won the most film awards, winning in both categories in which it was nominated.

Winners and nominees
Winners are listed first and highlighted in boldface.

Screen Actors Guild Life Achievement Award 
 James Earl Jones

Film

Television

In Memoriam 
Susan Sarandon introduced a previously recorded "In Memoriam" segment which pay tribute to the actors who died last year:

 Charlton Heston
 Ivan Dixon
 Kim Chan
 Don S. Davis
 Majel Barrett
 David Groh
 Stanley Kamel
 Harvey Korman
 Edie Adams
 Paul Scofield
 Mel Ferrer
 Sam Bottoms
 Cyd Charisse
 Robert Prosky
 Robert DoQui
 Don LaFontaine
 Patrick McGoohan
 Christopher Allport
 Dick Martin
 Paul Benedict
 Gil Stratton
 Beverly Garland
 Sydney Pollack
 Isaac Hayes
 Evelyn Keyes
 Barry Morse
 John Phillip Law
 Ruth Cohen
 Ricardo Montalbán
 Augusta Dabney
 George Furth
 Van Johnson
 Bernie Mac
 Pat Hingle
 Don Galloway
 George Carlin
 Richard Widmark
 Estelle Getty
 Bernie Hamilton
 Roy Scheider
 Eartha Kitt
 Nina Foch
 Paul Newman

References

External links 
 SAG Awards official site 
 Newsday

2008
2008 film awards
2008 television awards
2008 guild awards
Screen
Screen Actors Guild
Screen
January 2009 events in the United States